The Guayquiraró River (Spanish, Río Guayquiraró) is a river in the Mesopotamic northeastern region of Argentina. It is born in the middle section of the border between the provinces of Entre Ríos and Corrientes, fed from several streams on its right-hand basin.

See also
 List of rivers of Argentina

References

 Secretaría de Minería de la Nación. Provincia de Corrientes - Recursos hídricos.

Rivers of Argentina
Rivers of Corrientes Province
Rivers of Entre Ríos Province
Tributaries of the Paraná River